The 1932 United States Senate election in Washington was held on November 8, 1932. Incumbent Republican U.S. Senator Wesley Livsey Jones ran for a fifth term in office, but was defeated by former State Representative Homer Bone.

Bone defeated Jones in a landslide. The percentage margin of 27.9 points may be the largest for any incumbent major-party nominee in Senate history. Jones died on November 19, less than two weeks after the election.

Blanket primary

Candidates

Democratic
Lloyd Black, former Snohomish County prosecutor
Homer Bone, former Farmer-Labor State Representative from Tacoma
Edwin J. Brown, former mayor of Seattle (1922–1926)
Stephen J. Chadwick, former Chief Justice of the Washington Supreme Court

Republican
Adam Beeler, Justice of the Washington Supreme Court
Wesley Livsey Jones, incumbent Senator since 1909

Results

General election

Candidates
 Homer Bone, former State Representative from Tacoma (Democratic)
 Frederick R. Burch (Liberty)
 Andrew T. Hunter (Socialist)
 Wesley Livsey Jones, incumbent U.S. Senator since 1908 (Republican)
 Alex Noral (Communist)

Results

See also 
 1932 United States Senate elections

Notes

References 

1932
United States Senate
Washington